Princess Anne (only daughter of Queen Elizabeth II) has been married twice, in 1973 and 1992:

First wedding
The wedding dress worn by Princess Anne for her marriage to Captain Mark Phillips on 14 November 1973 at Westminster Abbey was designed by Maureen Baker, the chief designer for the ready-to-wear label Susan Small; she had previously designed outfits for the princess.
 
The dress was an embroidered "Tudor-style" wedding dress with a high collar and "mediaeval sleeves". The train was embroidered by Lock's Embroiderers. Princess Anne was said to have designed many aspects of the dress herself. Compared to previous royal wedding dresses, it was described as "simplistic" and was noted as being close to contemporary 1970s wedding fashions.

Second wedding
For the wedding dress worn for her marriage to Timothy Laurence on 12 December 1992 at Crathie Kirk, Princess Anne wore a white jacket over a "demure, cropped-to-the-knee dress" and a spray of white flowers in her hair.

See also
 List of individual dresses

References 

Anne
British royal attire
1970s fashion
1973 in London
English fashion
Weddings at Westminster Abbey
Anne, Princess Royal